Ameerega boehmei is a species of frog in the family Dendrobatidae. It is endemic to the Chiquitania region in the Santa Cruz Department, Bolivia, where it is known from two isolated sandstone massifs,  and Serranía de Chochis. It is similar to Ameerega flavopicta and has been confused with that species. The specific name boehmei honors , for "his support of the scientific careers of all authors from early days on". Common name Boehmei's poison arrow frog has been proposed for this species.

Description
Adults measure  in snout–vent length; although the largest specimen was a female, males and females do not differ in size overall. The body is slender and the head is narrower than the body. The snout is rounded. The tympanum is distinct. The fingers and toes have no webbing. Skin is dorsally slightly granular. The dorsal background color is black. There are bright yellow dorsolateral and labial lines as well as mid-dorsal spots and/or dots. The limbs are brown with black or black with bright yellow markings. The ventral surfaces are light grey to light brown with black marbling.

The male advertisement call is a series of indistinctly pulsed, upward modulated notes. The dominant frequency is about 2.7–3.2 kHz.

Habitat and conservation
They are diurnal and commonly occur close to slowly running streams, but can also be found as far as 50 m from a waterbody. Reproduction appears to take place during the wet season in November–April. The eggs are deposited on land. The adults will later transport the tadpoles to shallow pools and temporary puddles where they develop further.

This species can be locally abundant, but some populations appear to have declined. It is threatened by fires, which are used for improving and expanding pasture land for cattle. It occurs in Tucavaca Valley Municipal Reserve reserve.

Notes

References

boehmei
Endemic fauna of Bolivia
Amphibians of Bolivia
Amphibians described in 2009
Taxa named by Andreas Schmitz